Chital is a village in Amreli Taluka of Amreli district, Gujarat, India.

Demographics
The population of Chital according to the census of 1872 was 3908 and according to that of 1881 3959 souls.

Notes

References

Princely states of Gujarat
Villages in Amreli district